Meredith Hope Eaton Gordon (sometimes credited as Meredith Eaton-Gilden; born August 26, 1974) is an American actress. She is known for portraying the attorney Emily Resnick on the CBS television series Family Law (in which she was the first female with dwarfism to fill a regular role in an American prime time series), for her recurring role as Bethany Horowitz on the ABC series Boston Legal, and for her lead role as Matilda "Matty" Webber on the CBS series MacGyver.

Early life
Eaton was born on Long Island, New York, to a clinical social worker mother and an administrative law judge father. She attended Hofstra University in Hempstead, New York, where she was an active member of the Delta Phi Epsilon sorority; she graduated in 1996 with a degree in interdisciplinary studies, minoring in theater. In June 2007, she was named by Hofstra University as their Alumnus of the Month.

She later earned a master's degree in clinical psychology from the Derner Institute of Advanced Psychological Studies at Adelphi University, where she achieved a 4.0 grade point average. She would later credit her training in psychology for giving her a better ability to understand character dynamics in preparing for acting roles.

Professional career

Eaton's acting career began in 1999 when she attended an open casting call for the comedy film Unconditional Love. Despite it being her first audition, she won out over 500 women from Canada, the United States, and the United Kingdom to be cast in the role of Maudey Beasley.

Unconditional Love was not released until 2002. Her performance was seen by Paul Haggis, who created the role of Emily Resnick for her on Family Law. Joining the cast in 2002, she continued with the series until its cancellation later that same year. She later had significant guest appearances on NYPD Blue, Dharma & Greg, CSI: Crime Scene Investigation, House and NCIS. She also appeared as herself in Standing Tall at Auschwitz, which was a History Channel documentary on the Ovitz family, and in No Bigger Than a Minute, an independent documentary on dwarfism which aired on the PBS program P.O.V.

In 2006, she joined the cast of Boston Legal as Bethany Horowitz, a love interest to William Shatner's character Denny Crane. The role was written specifically for her by David E. Kelley.

Meredith has portrayed Carol Wilson, a recurring character on CBS' NCIS for over 6 seasons and its spin-off NCIS: New Orleans, an immunologist who works for the CDC and is a friend of forensic scientist Abby Sciuto. In 2013 Meredith starred opposite Christopher Walken and Bill Nighy in David Hare's Turks & Caicos.  In 2016, Meredith became a series regular on the CBS show MacGyver.  She plays Matilda "Matty" Webber, MacGyver's boss and the new director of operations at The Phoenix Foundation.

Personal life
Eaton married Brian Gordon on October 12, 2008. Gordon is a professional photographer. They have one child together, a daughter.

Eaton was previously married to Michael Gilden from 2001 until his death in 2006.

Filmography

Film

Television

References

External links

 
 Clip from the documentary No Bigger Than a Minute (video)

American women psychologists
Actresses from New York (state)
American television actresses
Actors with dwarfism
Hofstra University alumni
Adelphi University alumni
People from Long Island
1974 births
Living people
20th-century American actresses
21st-century American actresses